Denton is a town in Tameside, Greater Manchester, England.  The town and the township of Haughton contain 18 listed buildings that are recorded in the National Heritage List for England.  Of these, one is listed at Grade I, the highest of the three grades, three are at Grade II*, the middle grade, and the others are at Grade II, the lowest grade.

Denton was a scattered rural community until coal mining started in the late 18th century, and in the 19th century it became a centre for the hatting industry.  The earliest listed buildings are a church and a mounting block in the churchyard, a house with associated farm buildings, and a farmhouse.  The buildings from the 19th century include houses, a workshop, churches and associated structures, a bandstand, and a war memorial.


Key

Buildings

References

Citations

Sources

Lists of listed buildings in Greater Manchester
Listed